The Winslow Chemical Laboratory was a laboratory of the Rensselaer Polytechnic Institute campus in Troy, New York, United States, which finished construction in 1866. It is named in honor of the 5th President of RPI, John F. Winslow, who donated half of the construction cost. The building is brick with stone trimmings and was originally constructed with butternut, chestnut and black walnut. The whole building was fitted for complete courses in general and analytical chemistry. The design and construction was overseen by Professor Henry B. Nason, head of the department of chemistry at the Institute. The lower story contained the metallurgical laboratory and second story contained the chemical laboratory, store rooms and work rooms. The laboratory could accommodate about 40 students. The third story contained a lecture room, a private study, the library and a recitation room. The library of chemical books was established by a donation of several sets of journals and a gift of three hundred dollars from John F. Winslow.

The laboratory was damaged by a fire in the upper story in 1884 and was rebuilt and enlarged in 1885. The building was again damaged by fire in 1904. It was used as a laboratory until 1907 and then converted into a shop. The building, falling into disrepair, was boarded up in the early 1970s and targeted for demolition. It was added to the National Register of Historic Places on November 4, 1990. As an effort to save the building, it was agreed with the city of Troy that the building would be leased to house a new children's science museum called the Junior Museum. The Junior Museum refurbished the Winslow building and opened its doors in 2000. Since then, the Junior Museum has moved to the Rensselaer Technology Park, and currently the Winslow Building is home to many research groups affiliated to Cognitive Science and Computer science departments of Rensselaer, namely, Rensselaer AI and Reasoning Lab, the Social and Behavioral Research Laboratory, the Tetherless World Constellation (since 2007) etc.

Gallery

References

External links
 Winslow Building on RPI Map
 Winslow Building on Tetherless World Constellation Website

School buildings completed in 1885
Rensselaer Polytechnic Institute
National Register of Historic Places in Troy, New York
Buildings and structures in Troy, New York